= Jerome Hardeman Sneed =

American politician

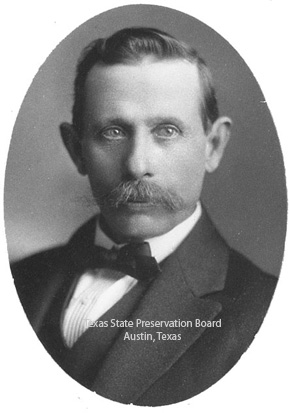

Member of the Texas House of Representatives from the 41 district
- In office 1918–1923
- Preceded by: Woodville J. Rogers Jr.
- Succeeded by: Eli Brown Barrett

Personal details
- Born: February 25, 1864 Collin County
- Died: March 26, 1950 (age 86) Dallas, Texas
- Party: Democrat
- Spouse: Susan Elizabeth Batson
- Parent(s): Robert Scales Sneed; Malinda Jane Kerr

Jerome Hardeman Sneed (February 25, 1864 – March 26, 1950) was an American politician from Texas. He served three terms as a member of the Texas House of Representatives for District 41, while living there in McKinney. He also worked as a merchant and teacher.

== Career ==
Sneed's Official Photos for each of his terms.

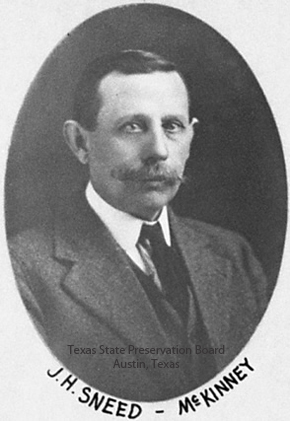
Official 35th Legislature Photo

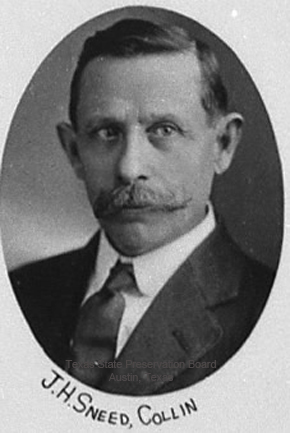
Official 36th Legislature Photo

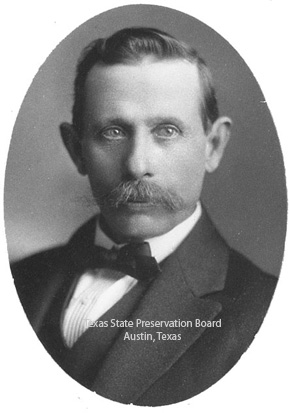
Official 37th Legislature Photo

=== 35th Legislature ===
Sneed was elected to the Texas House of Representatives' 35th legislature as a replacement for Woodville J. Rogers Jr., in a special February 1918 election partway through the legislature's term. He represented his home county, McKinney/Collin. His political affiliation was never confirmed, but is presumed Democrat from his future terms.

=== 36th & 37th Legislature ===
Sneed was subsequently elected to two consecutive full terms, and left office in January 1923. During his two full terms, Sneed was listed as a Democrat both times.

== Personal life ==
He married Susan Elizabeth Batson, and had seven children, although one died in infancy. He died in Dallas on March 26, 1950, age 86.
